Joel Mattsson (born 17 March 1999) is a Finnish professional footballer who plays for Danish club Vejle BK, as a midfielder.

Career
On 23 December 2018, HIFK announced the signing of Mattsson. In January 2020 Danish club Vejle Boldklub confirmed that Mattson would join the club on a one-and-a-half year contract from January 2021. He moved on loan to IFK Mariehamn for the 2021 season.

References

External links

1999 births
Living people
Finnish footballers
Finnish expatriate footballers
IFK Mariehamn players
FC Åland players
HIFK Fotboll players
Vejle Boldklub players
Kakkonen players
Veikkausliiga players
Association football midfielders
Finnish expatriate sportspeople in Denmark
Expatriate men's footballers in Denmark
Finland youth international footballers